Ivan Leclare Eastman (April 1, 1884 – February 28, 1949) was an American sport shooter, who competed in the 1908 Summer Olympics.

In the 1908 Olympics he won a gold medal in the team military rifle event and was 13th in 1000 yard free rifle event.

References

External links
profile

1884 births
1949 deaths
American male sport shooters
ISSF rifle shooters
Shooters at the 1908 Summer Olympics
Olympic gold medalists for the United States in shooting
Olympic medalists in shooting
Medalists at the 1908 Summer Olympics
People from Putnam County, Ohio
20th-century American people